Mats Stefan Waltin (born 7 October 1953) is a Swedish ice hockey coach and former player. During his career he played 236 international matches and won Olympic bronze medals in 1980 and 1984, world championship silvers in 1977 and 1981, and world championship bronzes in 1975, 1976 and 1979. A the European championships he won silver medals in 1976, 1977 and 1981 and bronzes in 1975, 1978, 1979 and 1983.  He was a member of the Swedish 1976 Canada Cup and 1981 Canada Cup teams and served as the team captain at the 1980 Olympics and as the Olympic flag bearer for Sweden at the 1984 games. He was awarded the Stora Grabbars och Tjejers Märke #97 in ice hockey. Domestically Waltin was awarded the Guldpucken as the best player at the 1976 Swedish Championships; he also won the national title with Djurgårdens in 1983. Between 1984 and 1989 he played in Switzerland and won the Swiss title in 1986 and 1987. In 1989, he returned to Sweden, and won his second national title with Djurgårdens in 1990. 

Since retiring from competitions in 1991 Waltin works as an ice hockey coach. In 1991–1998 he was the assistant coach and in 1998–2002 head coach of Djurgårdens IF, leading them to the national titles in 2000 and 2001. In 2002 he managed the national team at the world championships and in 2002–2004 served as the manager of Djurgårdens IF. He then went abroad, coaching Klagenfurter AC in Austria in 2004–2006, the Slovenian national team in 2007–2008 and Manglerud Star Ishockey in Norway since 2012.

Career statistics

Regular season and playoffs

International

References

External links

1953 births
Living people
Ice hockey people from Stockholm
Djurgårdens IF Hockey players
Ice hockey players at the 1980 Winter Olympics
Ice hockey players at the 1984 Winter Olympics
Olympic bronze medalists for Sweden
Olympic ice hockey players of Sweden
Slovenia men's national ice hockey team coaches
Södertälje SK players
Swedish ice hockey players
Olympic medalists in ice hockey
Medalists at the 1984 Winter Olympics
Djurgårdens IF Hockey coaches
Swedish Hockey League coaches